The augment is a prefix used in certain Indo-European languages (Indo-Iranian, Greek, Armenian and Phrygian) to indicate past time. The augment is of rather late origin in Proto-Indo-European, and in the oldest daughter languages such as Vedic Sanskrit and early Greek, it is used optionally. The same verb forms when used without the augment carry an injunctive sense.

The augment originally appears to have been a separate word, with the potential meaning of 'there, then', which in time got fused to the verb.

Greek
The predominant scholarly view on the prehistory of the augment is that it was originally a separate particle, although dissenting opinions have occasionally been voiced.

Homeric Greek
In Homer, past-tense (aorist or imperfect) verbs appeared both with and without an augment.

Ancient Greek
In Ancient Greek, the verb λέγω légo "I say"  has the aorist ἔλεξα élexa "I  said." The initial ε e is the augment. When it comes before a consonant, it is called the "syllabic augment" because it adds a syllable. Sometimes the syllabic augment appears before a vowel because the initial consonant of the verbal root (usually digamma) was lost:
 *έ-ϝιδον *é-widon → (loss of digamma) *ἔιδον *éidon → (synaeresis) εἶδον eîdon

When the augment is added before a vowel, the augment and the vowel are contracted and the vowel becomes long: ἀκούω akoúō "I hear", ἤκουσα ḗkousa "I heard". It is sometimes called the "temporal augment" because it increases the time needed to pronounce the vowel.

Modern Greek
Unaccented syllabic augment disappeared in some dialects during the Byzantine period as a result of the loss of unstressed initial syllables, this feature being inherited by Standard Modern Greek. However, accented syllabic augments have remained in place. So Ancient ἔλυσα, ἐλύσαμεν (élūsa, elū́samen) "I loosened, we loosened" corresponds to Modern έλυσα, λύσαμε (élisa, lísame). The temporal augment has not survived in the vernacular, which leaves the initial vowel unaltered: Ancient ἀγαπῶ, ἠγάπησα (agapô, ēgápēsa) "I love, I loved"; Modern αγαπώ, αγάπησα (agapó, agápisa).

Sanskrit

The augment is used in Sanskrit to form the imperfect, aorist, pluperfect and conditional. When the verb has a prefix, the augment always sits between the prefix and the root. The following examples of verb forms in the third-person singular illustrate the phenomenon:

When the root starts with any of the vowels i-, u- or ṛ, the vowel is subject not to guṇa but vṛddhi.

 icch·á·ti -> aí·cch·a·t
 urṇó·ti -> aú·rṇo·t
 ṛdh·nó·ti -> ā́r·dh·no·t

Other
 Phrygian seems to have had an augment. 
 Classical Armenian had an augment, in the form of e-.
 Yaghnobi, an East Iranian language spoken in Tajikistan, has an augment.

Constructed languages
In J. R. R. Tolkien's Quenya, the repetition of the first vowel before the perfect (for instance utúlië, perfect tense of túlë, "come") is reminiscent of the Indo-European augment in both form and function, and is referred to by the same name in Tolkien's grammar of the language.

See also

Sanskrit verbs
Ancient Greek verbs
Proto-Indo-European verbs

Notes

References

Bibliography
 
 
 
 

Indo-European linguistics
Linguistic morphology
Greek grammar
Phonology